Vendetta is a 2022 American action-thriller revenge film written and directed by Jared Cohn and starring Clive Standen, Theo Rossi, Mike Tyson, Thomas Jane, and Bruce Willis.

The film was released in limited theaters and on-demand platforms on May 17, 2022, by Redbox Entertainment.

Plot
In suburban Georgia, family man and former marine William Duncan (Clive Standen) is out to pick up dinner with his 16-year-old daughter, Kat (Maddie Nichols), a softball player with dreams of playing professionally. While William retrieves the food, Kat is left in the car, where she is killed by brothers Rory (Theo Rossi) and Danny (Cabot Basden), on behalf of their father, kingpin Donnie (Bruce Willis). They are soon arrested by the authorities, but William rigs the court to fail, allowing Danny to go free. William elects to stalk and kill Danny the following night. Enraged, Donnie and Rory embark on a revenge path to eliminate William. Failing in their mission, William eventually kills Rory and Donnie.

Cast
Clive Standen as William Duncan
Theo Rossi as Rory Fetter
Mike Tyson as Roach
Thomas Jane as Dante
Bruce Willis as Donnie Fetter
Kurt Yue as Detective Brody
Lauren Buglioli as Jen Duncan
Maddie Nichols as Kat Duncan
Derek Russo as Zach
Caia Coley as Nurse Pam

Production
Filming wrapped in September 2021.

That same month,  Redbox Entertainment announced it had acquired American distribution rights to the film. Vendetta is one of the last films to star Willis, who retired from acting because he was diagnosed with frontotemporal dementia.

Release
Vendetta was released in limited theaters and on-demand platforms on May 17, 2022, by Redbox Entertainment.

Critical response
Rene Rodriguez of Variety gave a negative review, saying, "the body count starts to mount. So do the implausibilities, along with the boredom." Brian Costello of Common Sense Media also gave a negative review, saying, "when the most earnest and compelling performance in a movie is turned in by Sir Mike Tyson, you know you're in trouble."

Box office
As of February 17, 2023, Vendetta grossed $175,173 in the United Arab Emirates, Russia, and South Korea.

References

External links
 
 
 

2022 films
2022 action films
2022 independent films
American action thriller films
American independent films
2020s English-language films
Films directed by Jared Cohn
2020s American films